Treadin' Water is the fifth studio album by American country music artist Earl Thomas Conley. It was released on October 1, 1984 via RCA Records. The album includes the singles "Chance of Lovin' You", "Love Don't Care (Whose Heart It Breaks)" and "Honor Bound".

Track listing

Chart performance

References

1984 albums
Earl Thomas Conley albums
RCA Records albums